Diaporthe fraxini-angustifoliae is a plant endophyte and occasionally a plant pathogen, first found on Fraxinus angustifolia subsp. oxycarpa in Australia.

References

Further reading
Fan, Xin-Lei, et al. "Diaporthe rostrata, a novel ascomycete from Juglans mandshurica associated with walnut dieback." Mycological Progress 14.10 (2015): 1–8.
Gopal, K., et al. "Citrus Melanose (Diaporthe citri Wolf): A Review." Int. J. Curr. Microbiol. App. Sci 3.4 (2014): 113–124.
Gao, YaHui, et al. "Diaporthe species occurring on Lithocarpus glabra in China, with descriptions of five new species." Fungal biology 119.5 (2015): 295–309.

External links
MycoBank

Fungal plant pathogens and diseases
fraxini-angustifoliae